R389 road may refer to:
 R389 road (Ireland)
 R389 road (South Africa)